Furness Bermuda Line was a UK shipping line that operated in the 20th century. It was part of Furness, Withy and ran passenger liners between New York and the British Overseas Territory of Bermuda from 1919 to 1966.

Origins
The Quebec Steam Ship Company had served Bermuda since 1874. Canada Steamship Lines took over the company in 1913 and sold it in 1919 to Furness, Withy, who renamed it the Furness Bermuda Line. At first the route had only one ship, the  Bermudian, which Sir James Laing & Sons had built in 1904 and which Furness, Withy renamed Fort Hamilton.

They were quadruple-expansion steamships that William Beardmore and Company in Glasgow had built in 1912 and 1913.

Furness, Withy had Willochra fitted out with berths for 400 first class passengers and renamed her Fort St. George. It had Wandilla modified to carry 380 first class and 50 second class passengers, replaced her cargo holds with tanks to supply Bermuda with fresh water, and renamed her .

At the same time Furness Withy invested in tourist development such as hotels on Bermuda.

Growing trade

Furness, Withy had competition from the Royal Mail Steam Packet Company, which had long served Bermuda. After the First World War enough tourists from North America wanted to sail to Bermuda for RMSP to employ prestigious "A-series" liners such as the  Araguaya,  Avon and  Arcadian on the route. However, in 1926 RMSP withdrew its service between the US, Bermuda and West Indies.

Furness, Withy sold Fort Hamilton and ordered a  passenger liner for the route. Normally it would take 27 months to build a ship of such size, but Workman, Clark and Company in Belfast completed the motor ship  in December 1927, just 16 months after laying her keel. She had berths for 691 passengers, could sail between New York and Hamilton in about 40 hours, and was an immediate success. 

The Great Depression that began in 1929 caused a worldwide slump in shipping. Most types of cargo and passenger traffic sharply declined. Many hundreds of ships were laid up, and thousands of officers and tens of thousands of seamen were laid off. Most of Furness, Withy's cargo and passenger services were affected.

But bookings from the US to Bermuda, many of them for one-week short holidays, remained buoyant. Furness, Withy ordered a second large ship in order to offer two sailings each week: one on Saturday and the other midweek.

However, before the new ship could be completed, Furness, Withy suffered two setbacks. In December 1929 Fort Victoria was sunk when the   collided with her in fog in Ambrose Channel off New York. Then in June 1931, Bermudas passenger accommodation was gutted by fire in Hamilton Harbour. Bermudas hull and main engines survived, so she was returned to Workman, Clark to be repaired.

But in the shipping slump, even modern passenger liners were laid up and readily available. Furness, Withy was able to charter ships including Cunard Line's   and the Veendam (II) of Holland America Line vessel to maintain its Bermuda service.

The "Millionaires' Ships"

Monarch of Bermuda was launched in March 1931 and completed that November. At  was larger and more luxurious than Bermuda, with berths for 830 first class and 30 second class passengers. Vickers-Armstrongs built Monarch of Bermuda at its Walker shipyard. She was a turbine steamer, and was Furness, Withy's first ship to have turbo-electric transmission. She was swifter than Bermuda, easily exceeding  on her sea trials.

In November 1931 Bermudas rebuild at Belfast was nearly complete when she suffered a second fire that caused more serious damage than the first. Between them the two fires caused damage estimated to cost her underwriters £1.25 million. Workman, Clark bought the wreck and Furness, Withy ordered a turbo-electric sister ship for Monarch of Bermuda.

The latter maintained the service alongside Monarch of Bermuda until  was completed.

Vickers-Armstrongs built the  Queen of Bermuda at its Barrow-in-Furness shipyard, launching her in September 1932 and completing her in February 1933.

Queen of Bermuda looked like Monarch of Bermuda but had slightly larger cabins and only 731 berths. They were nicknamed the "Millionaires' Ships".

The pair competed with each other on speed. Eventually Queen of Bermuda took the record with a passage from New York to Hamilton in 32 hours, 48 minutes, which meant that her speed averaged .

In 1935 Furness, Withy sold Fort St. George to Lloyd Triestino, who renamed her Cesarea. In 1938, to meet the high demand of the Bermuda service, Furness charted White Star Line's Georgic to operate in tandem with the Monarch of Bermuda and Queen of Bermuda.

Second World War 

In the Second World War Monarch of Bermuda was converted into a troop ship and the Admiralty requisitioned Queen of Bermuda as an armed merchant cruiser. Queen of Bermuda was released from the Royal Navy in 1943 and spent the next few years as a troop ship.

Both ships survived the war, but for a while afterwards the Ministry of Transport continued to use both ships as military and government transports. Furness, Withy made do with two small ships on the route between New York and Bermuda.

Eventually the UK Government released Monarch of Bermuda and Furness, Withy started having her converted back into a luxury liner to return to her former route. But in March 1947 while being refitted she was damaged by fire, so Furness Withy sold her to the UK Government. The UK Government then released Queen of Bermuda. Her refit took 18 months, cost more than her original building and was not completed until February 1949.

Post War Voyages & Fleet 

The Queen of Bermuda returned to the New York-Bermuda service after the war. To replace the Monarch of Bermuda, Furness, Withy ordered a smaller ship. the  Ocean Monarch, completed by Vickers-Armstrongs at Walker in 1951. 

In October 1961 the Queen of Bermuda was sent to Harland and Wolff in Belfast for a refit, to modernize the ship. The bow was reshaped, and all three funnels were removed, replaced with one funnel amidships. This gave the ship the distinction of being the only ocean liner to have sailed with one, two and three funnels. 

The two ships continued to serve the island until late 1966, when Furness, Withy ceased its Bermuda service. The Queen of Bermuda was sold for scrap, while the Ocean Monarch was laid up until 1967,  when she was sold to Navigation Maritime Bulgare and renamed Varna.

Fleet

Furness Bermuda Passenger Fleet

Furness Bermuda Tenders

Chartered Fleet 

 Veendam, Holland America Line, (chartered: Winter-Summer 1930)
Carinthia, Cunard Line, (chartered 1931)
Franconia, Cunard Line, (chartered: 1931 & 1932)
 , Canadian Pacific Line, (chartered: 1931 & 1932)
 Duchess of Bedford, Canadian Pacific Line, (chartered: 1931 & 1932) 
Georgic, White Star Line (chartered: 1938)
Lancastria, Cunard Line, (chartered 1939)

Furness Bermuda Line Hotels 

Furness Withy purchased and constructed several hotels in Bermuda, using the tenders Bermudian and Castle Harbour to ferry passengers to hotels outside of the main harbor in Hamilton. Furness sold all its hotels in 1958.

 Mid Ocean Club (Tucker's Town)
 The St. George (St. George's)
 Bermudiana (Hamilton Harbor)
 Castle Harbour Hotel (Castle Harbor)

References

Bibliography

External links

Queen of Bermuda Promotional Film 1962
Bermuda Ship Fire News Film
Furness Bermuda Line and two pairs of Sisters, by Allen Soares

1919 establishments in New York (state)
1966 disestablishments in New York (state)
British companies established in 1919
Defunct shipping companies of the United Kingdom
Maritime history of Bermuda
Transport companies disestablished in 1966
Transport companies established in 1919